Grangemouth TMD was a traction maintenance depot located in Grangemouth, Scotland. The depot was situated on the Edinburgh to Dunblane Line and was near Falkirk Grahamston station. 

The depot code is GM.

History 
Before its closure in 1993, Class 06 and 08 shunters could be seen at the depot.

References 
 

 Railway depots in Scotland